Vorogovo is a rural locality (selo) in Turukhansky District, Krasnoyarsk Krai. It had a population of 856 in 2010, a decrease from its 2002 population of 1104.

Climate

Vorogovo has a subarctic climate (Dfc)

References

Rural localities in Turukhansky District
Road-inaccessible communities of Krasnoyarsk Krai